Bayfield is a city in Bayfield County, Wisconsin, United States. The population was 584 at the 2020 census. This makes it the city with the smallest population in Wisconsin. In fact, for a new city to be incorporated today, state regulations require a population of at least 1,000 residents, so it would have to be incorporated as a village instead.

Wisconsin Highway 13 serves as a main route in the community. It is a former county seat, lumbering town, and commercial fishing community, which today is a tourist and resort destination. There are many restaurants, hotels, bed & breakfast establishments, specialty shops, and marine services. The local Chamber of Commerce refers to Bayfield as the "Gateway to the Apostle Islands".

History
Bayfield was named in 1856 for Henry Bayfield, a British Royal Topographic Engineer who explored the region in 1822–23. A post office has been in operation at Bayfield since 1856.

Geography
Bayfield is located at  (46.8115, -90.8203).

Bayfield is the main gateway to the Apostle Islands National Lakeshore, a group of 21 islands in Lake Superior. Madeline Island is the largest of the Apostle Islands and the only one not in the National Lakeshore. A ferry to Madeline Island links Bayfield with La Pointe, Wisconsin, a community on the island.

Climate

Demographics

2020 census
As of the census of 2020, the population was 584. The racial makeup of the city was 80.1% White, 11.0% Native American, 0.7% Black or African American, 0.2% Asian, 0.5% from other races, and 7.5% from two or more races. Ethnically, the population was 1.5% Hispanic or Latino of any race.

2010 census
At the 2010 census there were 487 people in 261 households, including 130 families, in the city. The racial makeup of the city was 77.8% White, 0.2% African American, 14.8% Native American, 1.0% Asian, and 6.2% from two or more races. Hispanic or Latino of any race were 1.8%.

Of the 261 households, 16.5% had children under the age of 18 living with them, 39.5% were married couples living together, 8.8% had a female householder with no husband present, 1.5% had a male householder with no wife present, and 50.2% were non-families. 44.1% of households were one person and 18.7% were one person aged 65 or older. The average household size was 1.87 and the average family size was 2.58.

The median age was 53.2 years. 15.4% of residents were under the age of 18; 3.2% were between the ages of 18 and 24; 18.6% were from 25 to 44; 36% were from 45 to 64; 26.9% were 65 or older. The gender makeup of the city was 48.9% male and 51.1% female.

2000 census
At the 2000 census there were 611 people in 289 households, including 167 families, in the city. The population density was 703.3 people per square mile (271.2/km). There were 403 housing units at an average density of 463.8 per square mile (178.8/km).  The racial makeup of the city was 76.92% White, 0.65% Black or African American, 15.22% Native American, 1.31% from other races, and 5.89% from two or more races. Hispanic or Latino of any race were 0.49%. 10.5% were of American, 10.1% German, 9.4% Norwegian, 8.1% Irish, 7.4% Swedish and 5.4% English ancestry according to Census 2000.

Of the 289 households, 22.8% had children under the age of 18 living with them, 41.2% were married couples living together, 11.4% had a female householder with no spouse present, and 41.9% were non-families. 35.6% of households were one person and 15.9% were one person aged 65 or older. The average household size was 2.10 and the average family size was 2.64.

The age distribution was 20.9% under the age of 18, 6.9% from 18 to 24, 21.4% from 25 to 44, 33.1% from 45 to 64, and 17.7% 65 or older. The median age was 45 years. For every 100 females, there were 89.8 males. For every 100 females age 18 and over, there were 85.8 males.

The median household income was $32,266 and the median family income was $36,500. Males had a median income of $34,375 versus $25,875 for females. The per capita income for the city was $18,377. About 10.5% of families and 11.8% of the population were below the poverty line, including 20.5% of those under age 18 and 4.6% of those age 65 or over.

Arts and culture 

The city of Bayfield is known in the Anishinaabe language as Oshki-oodena ("New-town"), as opposed to Superior, Wisconsin, which is known as Gete-oodena ("Old-town"), in reference to the Ojibwa migration.

The Bayfield Maritime Museum and Bayfield Heritage Museum are the city's two museums. There are several art galleries. Nearby is the 950 seats all-canvas tent theater known as Big Top Chautauqua which during its summer season has hosted such entertainers as Willie Nelson and Lyle Lovett.

Bayfield's annual Apple Fest draws about 60,000 visitors during the first weekend in October. Popular summertime events include the Bayfield Race Week regatta, held during the week of the 4th of July, and the Festival of Arts and Gallery Tour, which takes place the third weekend of July. It features artists from across the midwest, along with tours and demos at a diverse array of local galleries.

Recreation

The Apostle Islands Sled Dog Race takes place the first weekend of February. It is the largest sled dog race in the Midwest, with between 50 and 75 teams competing annually.

Transportation
Bus service to the community is provided by Bay Area Rural Transit.

Local media

Bayfield receives three radio stations from Ashland; WATW, WBSZ and WJJH. Television stations come from the Duluth–Superior market; KDLH, KBJR, WDSE and WDIO.

Gallery

Notable people
 Laurie E. Carlson, Wisconsin State Representative, 1937–42, born in Bayfield
 Norris J. Nelson, Los Angeles City Council member, 1939–43, born in Bayfield
 Nathan Van Cleave, Composer for Television, including "The Twilight Zone," born in Bayfield
 Lou Alta Melton (1895 – 1974), an American civil engineer and bridge engineer

See also
 Bayfield group

References

External links
City of Bayfield
Bayfield Chamber of Commerce
Sanborn fire insurance maps: 1886 1892 1898 1904 1911

 
Cities in Wisconsin
Cities in Bayfield County, Wisconsin
Piers in Wisconsin
1856 establishments in Wisconsin
Former county seats in Wisconsin
Wisconsin populated places on Lake Superior